Clitoria is a genus of mainly tropical and subtropical, insect-pollinated flowering pea vines.

Taxonomy

Naming of the genus

This genus was named after the human clitoris, for the flowers bear a resemblance to the vulva. The first reference to the genus, which includes an illustration of the plant, was made in 1678 by Jakób Breyne, a Polish naturalist, who described it as Flos clitoridis ternatensibus, meaning 'Ternatean flower of the clitoris'.
Many vernacular names of these flowers in different languages are similarly based on references to female external genitalia.

Controversies existed in the past among botanists regarding the good taste of the naming of the genus. The analogy drew sharp criticism from botanists such as James Edward Smith in 1807, Amos Eaton in 1817, Michel Étienne Descourtilz in 1826, and Eaton and Wright in 1840. Some less explicit alternatives, like Vexillaria (Eaton 1817) and Nauchea (Descourtilz 1826), were proposed, but they failed to prosper, and the name Clitoria has survived to this day.

Species

, Plants of the World Online accepted the following species:

Clitoria amazonum Mart. ex Benth.
Clitoria andrei Fantz
Clitoria annua J.Graham
Clitoria arborea Benth.
Clitoria arborescens R.Br.
Clitoria australis Benth.
Clitoria brachycalyx Harms
Clitoria brachystegia Benth.
Clitoria canescens Pittier ex Fantz
Clitoria cavalcantei Fantz
Clitoria cearensis Huber
Clitoria chanondii Chuakul
Clitoria cordiformis Fantz
Clitoria cordobensis Burkart
Clitoria coriacea Schery
Clitoria dendrina Pittier
Clitoria densiflora (Benth.) Benth.
Clitoria epetiolata Burkart
Clitoria fairchildiana R.A.Howard
Clitoria falcata Lam.
Clitoria flagellaris (Benth.) Benth.
Clitoria flexuosa Fantz
Clitoria fragrans Small
Clitoria froesii Fantz
Clitoria glaberrima Pittier
Clitoria guianensis (Aubl.) Benth.
Clitoria hanceana Hemsl.
Clitoria hermannii Fantz
Clitoria heterophylla Lam.
Clitoria humilis Rose
Clitoria irwinii Fantz
Clitoria javanica Miq.
Clitoria javitensis (Kunth) Benth.
Clitoria juninensis Fantz
Clitoria kaessneri Harms
Clitoria kaieteurensis Fantz
Clitoria lasciva Bojer ex Benth.
Clitoria laurifolia Poir.
Clitoria leptostachya Benth.
Clitoria linearis Gagnep.
Clitoria macrophylla Wall. ex Benth.
Clitoria magentea Fantz
Clitoria mariana L.
Clitoria mexicana Link
Clitoria monticola Brandegee
Clitoria moyobambensis Fantz
Clitoria mucronulata Benth.
Clitoria nana Benth.
Clitoria nervosa Herzog
Clitoria obidensis Huber
Clitoria pendens Fantz
Clitoria pilosula Wall. ex Benth.
Clitoria plumosa Fantz
Clitoria polystachya Benth.
Clitoria pozuzoensis J.F.Macbr.
Clitoria sagotii Fantz
Clitoria selloi Benth.
Clitoria simplicifolia (Kunth) Benth.
Clitoria snethlageae Ducke
Clitoria speciosa Cav.
Clitoria steyermarkii Fantz
Clitoria stipularis Benth.
Clitoria ternatea L.
Clitoria triflora S.Watson
Clitoria tunuhiensis Fantz
Clitoria woytkowskii Fantz

Distribution
These plants are native to tropical, subtropical and temperate areas of the world, from western North America east to Australia.

Uses
The most widely known species of the genus is Clitoria ternatea, also known as butterfly pea. It is used as an herbal medicine, and it is used as food, as well. Its roots are used in ayurveda Hindu medicine.

Gallery

See also
 Centrosema
 List of taxa named after human genitals

References

Further reading

 
Fabaceae genera
Taxa named by Carl Linnaeus